Coachwhip may refer to:

 a type of whip used by the driver of a horse-drawn coach, usually provided with a long lash
 Coachwhip (snake), various North American snakes
 Coachwhip (comics), a character of the Marvel Universe
 Coachwhips, a noise/punk band